Western Springs Reserve, also known as Western Springs Lakeside Park, consists of a sanctuary for wildlife, surrounding a lake fed by the natural springs. There are walking paths surrounding the lake with bridges going across sections of it. Auckland Zoo, MOTAT and Western Springs Stadium are all situated around the park.

History

The park is the site of a natural freshwater aquifer, where water comes through the surface through cracks in basalt lava flow from Te Tātua a Riukiuta. The aquifer and wetland were traditionally known by the name Te Wai Ōrea to Tāmaki Māori, referring to the eels that lived in the lake. Prior to European settlement, the land was primarily a pūriri lava rock forest ecosystem, a now rare ecosystem consisting of plants growing in a minimal soil environment, growing amongst rock and leaf humus.

In 1877, an earth dam was constructed to create a larger artificial lake, in order to serve as the source of Auckland's drinking water. The Western Springs lake was the source for Auckland's drinking water for the next 30 years.

In 1922, the Auckland Zoo was opened adjacent to the lake, followed by the Western Springs Stadium in 1929 and MOTAT in 1964. During the Depression in the early 1930s, the area adjacent to Motions Road was developed as a camping ground. During World War II, the camping ground was used as a military camp for the United States Armed Forces. Afterwards, Western Springs was proposed as a site for an amusement park in 1953, however this did not eventuate due to a lack of funding. In 1961, the Auckland City Council parks department began administering the area, and in 1977 it was officially opened as a public park.

The Fukuoka Garden was developed in the park in 1989, gifted to Auckland by Fukuoka in recognition of their sister city relationship. This garden was officially added to the park in 2017.

Biodiversity

Waterfowl, such as swans, pūkeko and ducks make up a significant proportion of the visible wildlife of the park. While birdfeeding has historically been a large draw for the public to come to the park, this behaviour is being discouraged due to the negative effects this has on the environment.

The park is home to significant numbers of native eels, Anguilla australis and Anguilla dieffenbachii, in addition to a number of pest species such as koi carp. Grass carp were introduced into the lake in 2005, in order to control invasive plant species.

The park has a mix of exotic and native plant species. A number of threatened and rare New Zealand species are found in the park, including the haplolepideous moss Fissidens berteroi, short-hair plume grass (Dichelachne inaequiglumis), and the parasitic vine Cassytha paniculata (mawhai).

References

Lakes of the Auckland Region
Parks in Auckland
Protected areas of the Auckland Region
Nature reserves in New Zealand
Urban forests in New Zealand
Waitematā Local Board Area
Wetlands of New Zealand